Denis Viana da Silva (born 3 September 1986 in Cubatão, São Paulo), or more commonly Denis Silva, is a Brazilian footballer who most recently played for Syrianska FC as a defender.

References

External links
 
  
 

1986 births
Living people
Denis Silva
AFC Eskilstuna players
Syrianska FC players
Superettan players
Brazilian footballers
Association football defenders
Footballers from São Paulo (state)
People from Cubatão